Coryssocnemis is a genus of cellar spiders that was first described by Eugène Louis Simon in 1893.

Species
 it contains fourteen species, found in Central America, Brazil, Venezuela, Mexico, and on Trinidad:
Coryssocnemis aripo Huber, 2000 – Trinidad
Coryssocnemis callaica Simon, 1893 (type) – Venezuela
Coryssocnemis clara Gertsch, 1971 – Mexico
Coryssocnemis discolor Mello-Leitão, 1918 – Brazil
Coryssocnemis faceta Gertsch, 1971 – Mexico
Coryssocnemis guatopo Huber, 2000 – Venezuela
Coryssocnemis iviei Gertsch, 1971 – Mexico
Coryssocnemis lepidoptera Mello-Leitão, 1918 – Brazil
Coryssocnemis monagas Huber, 2000 – Venezuela
Coryssocnemis occulta Mello-Leitão, 1918 – Brazil
Coryssocnemis simla Huber, 2000 – Trinidad
Coryssocnemis tarsocurvipes (González-Sponga, 2003) – Venezuela
Coryssocnemis tigra Huber, 1998 – Honduras
Coryssocnemis viridescens Kraus, 1955 – El Salvador to Costa Rica

See also
 List of Pholcidae species

References

Araneomorphae genera
Pholcidae
Spiders of Central America
Spiders of Mexico
Spiders of South America